Maria Zazzi (10 June 1904 – 5 January 1993) was an Italian anarchist.
She was in the front line in the campaign for Sacco and Vanzetti. In 1932 she moved to Paris, where she met the Ukrainian anarchist Nestor Makhno and the Russian Volin.

In Bologna, in the late 1950s, she began a relationship with the anarchist Alfonso "Libero" Fantazzini, the father of Horst.

References 
Biography

Italian anarchists
1904 births
1993 deaths